Barthelemy Uggeri (died 1479) was a Roman Catholic prelate who served as Bishop of Brugnato (1467–1479).

On 23 December 1467, Barthelemy Uggeri was appointed during the papacy of Pope Paul II as Bishop of Brugnato.
He served as Bishop of Brugnato until his death in 1479. While bishop, he was the principal consecrator of Philippe Bartolomei, Bishop of Ario (1470), and the principal co-consecrator of Anton Nicolai, Auxiliary Bishop of Gniezno (1470).

References

External links and additional sources
 (for Chronology of Bishops) 
 (for Chronology of Bishops) 

Year of birth missing
1479 deaths
15th-century Italian Roman Catholic bishops
Bishops appointed by Pope Paul II